Manuel Alexander Vidal Ceballos (born 2 September 1996) is a Dominican footballer who plays as a central defender for Atletico De San Francisco and the Dominican Republic national team.

Honours
 Cibao
CFU Club Championship (1): 2017
Copa Dominicana (2): 2015-2016

References

External links
 

1996 births
Living people
People from Santiago de los Caballeros
Dominican Republic footballers
Association football central defenders
Dominican Republic international footballers